Ray Wilson may refer to:

 Ray Wilson (baseball) (1870–1912), American Negro leagues baseball player
 Raymond Wilson (physicist) (1928–2018), English physicist and telescope optics designer
 Ray Wilson (English footballer) (1934–2018), member of the England team that won the 1966 World Cup
 Ray Wilson (Australian rules footballer) (born 1945), former Australian rules footballer
 Ray Wilson (Scottish footballer) (born 1947), Scottish football full-back (West Bromwich Albion)
 Ray Wilson (speedway rider) (born 1947), English speedway rider
 Ray Wilson (musician) (born 1968), vocalist and musician (Stiltskin, Genesis)
 Ray Wilson (American football) (born 1971), US American footballer
 Ray Wilson (figure skater) (born 1944), British figure skater